A greatest hits album is a compilation album of successful, previously released songs by a particular music artist or band.

Albums entitled Greatest Hits, or similar titles,  listed alphabetically by band name or artist's last name, include:

0–9
 Greatest Hits by 2Pac (1998)
 Greatest Hits '93–'03 by 311 (2004)
 Best of 50 Cent by 50 Cent (2017)
 Greatest Hits by the 5th Dimension (1970)

A
 Greatest Hits by A*Teens (2005)
 Greatest Hits by ABBA (1975)
 Greatest Hits Vol. 2 by ABBA (1979)
 Gold: Greatest Hits by ABBA (1992)
 More ABBA Gold: More ABBA Hits by ABBA (1993)
 Greatest Hits by Ace of Base (2000)
 Greatest Hits by Aerosmith (1980)
 O, Yeah! Ultimate Aerosmith Hits by Aerosmith (2002)
 Devil's Got a New Disguise – The Very Best of Aerosmith by Aerosmith (2006)
 Keeps Gettin' Better: A Decade of Hits by Christina Aguilera (2008)
 Greatest Hits by Air Supply (1983)
 Greatest Hits by Alabama (1986)
 Greatest Hits Vol. II by Alabama (1991)
 Greatest Hits Vol. III by Alabama (1994)
 Greatest Hits by Alice in Chains (2001)
 Icon by Gary Allan (2012)
 Story (2000) by Amorphis 
 Chapters (2003) by Amorphis
 181920 by Namie Amuro (1998) 
 Love Enhanced Single Collection by Namie Amuro (2002) 
 Best Fiction by Namie Amuro (2008) 
 Finally by Namie Amuro (2017) 
 Pieces of a Dream by Anastacia (2005)
 Ultimate Collection by Anastacia (2015)
 Greatest Hits by John Anderson (1984)
 Greatest Hits Vol. 2 by John Anderson (1990)
 Greatest Hits by John Anderson (1996)
 The Best of Apocalyptica by Apocalyptica (2002)
 Greatest Hits by April Wine (1979)
 Greatest Hits Live 1997 by April Wine (1997)
 Greatest Hits Live 2003 by April Wine (2003)
 Greatest Hits by Aqua (2009)
 Greatest Hits? by As Friends Rust (2014)
 Intergalactic Sonic 7″s by Ash (2002)
 The Best of Ash by Ash (2011)
 Teenage Wildlife: 25 Years of Ash by Ash (2020)
 Greatest Hits! by The Association (1968)
 Greatest Hits by Rick Astley (2002)
 Greatest Hits by Rodney Atkins (2015)
 Greatest Hits by Atomic Kitten (2004)
 The Best of 2005-2013 by Avenged Sevenfold (2016)

B
 The Best of Andrea Bocelli: Vivere by the Andrea Bocelli (2007)
 The Hits: Chapter One by the Backstreet Boys (2001)
 Playlist: The Very Best of Backstreet Boys by the Backstreet Boys (2010)
 The Essential Backstreet Boys by the Backstreet Boys (2013)
 Hits: Greatest and Others by Joan Baez (1973)
 Greatest Hits by the Bangles (1990)
 Disc One: All Their Greatest Hits (1991–2001) by Barenaked Ladies (2001)
 The Greatest Hits - Volume 1: 20 Good Vibrations by the Beach Boys (1999)
 The Greatest Hits - Volume 2: 20 More Good Vibrations by the Beach Boys (1999)
 Solid Gold Hits by Beastie Boys (2005)
 1962–1966 (The Red Album) by the Beatles (1973)
 1967–1970 (The Blue Album) by the Beatles (1973)
 20 Greatest Hits by the Beatles (1982)
 1 by the Beatles (2000)
 Greatest Hits by Pat Benatar (2005)
 Greatest Hits by Better Than Ezra (2005)
 Greatest Hits by Big & Rich (2009)
 The Best of Big Bang 2006-2014 by Big Bang (2014)
 My Worlds: The Collection by Justin Bieber (2010)
 Greatest Hits by Björk (2002)
 Greatest Hits by Blink-182 (2005)
 Icon by Blink-182 (2013)
 The Best of Blondie by Blondie (1981)
 Greatest Hits by Blondie (2002)
 Greatest Hits by Blood, Sweat & Tears (1972)
 Don't Fear the Reaper: The Best of Blue Öyster Cult by Blue Öyster Cult (2000)
 Blur: The Best of by Blur (2000)
 Greatest Hits by Bone Thugs-n-Harmony (2004)
 The Greatest Hits by Boney M. (1993)
 The Greatest Hits by Boney M. (2001)
 25 Jaar Na Daddy Cool by Boney M. (2001)
 Greatest Hits by Bon Jovi (2010)
 Greatest Hits by Boston (1997)
 Legacy: The Greatest Hits Collection by Boyz II Men (2001)
 Shallow Bay: The Best of Breaking Benjamin by Breaking Benjamin (2011)
 The Greatest Hits Collection by Brooks & Dunn (1997)
 The Greatest Hits Collection II by Brooks & Dunn (2004)
 Greatest Hits by Chuck Brown (1998)
 Best of Chuck Brown by Chuck Brown (2005)
 Greatest Hits by Bucks Fizz (1983)
 Retrospective: The Best of Buffalo Springfield by Buffalo Springfield (1969)
 Greatest Hits by Tracy Byrd (2005)
 The Byrds' Greatest Hits by the Byrds (1967)
 The Best of The Byrds: Greatest Hits, Volume II by the Byrds (1972)

C
 The Best of Tevin Campbell by Tevin Campbell (2001)
 #1's by Mariah Carey (1998)
 Greatest Hits by Mariah Carey (2001)
 The Essential Mariah Carey by Mariah Carey (2011) 
 Number 1 to Infinity by Mariah Carey (2015)
 Most Requested Hits by Aaron Carter (2003)
 Come Get It: The Very Best of Aaron Carter by Aaron Carter (2006)
 2 Good 2 B True by Aaron Carter (2006)
 The Best of Candlebox by Candlebox (2006)
 Greatest Hits, Vol. 1 by Johnny Cash (1967)
 Greatest Hits, Vol. 2 by Johnny Cash (1971)
 Greatest Hits, Vol. 3 by Johnny Cash (1978)
 Greatest Hits by Cher (1974)
 Greatest Hits: 1965–1992 by Cher (1992)
 The Greatest Hits by Cher (1999)
 If I Could Turn Back Time: Cher's Greatest Hits by Cher (1999)
 The Very Best of Cher by Cher (2003)
 Gold by Cher (2005)
 Greatest Hits by Kenny Chesney (2000)
 Chicago IX by Chicago (1975)
 Greatest Hits, Volume II by Chicago (1981)
 Greatest Hits 1982-1989 by Chicago (1989)
 Greatest Hits by Chilliwack  (1983)
 Greatest Hits by the Chipmunks (1992)
 Greatest Hits 1994–2004 by Terri Clark (2004)
 Greatest Hits – Chapter One by Kelly Clarkson (2012)
 Icon by Joe Cocker (2011)
 Seven Year Itch by Collective Soul
 Colors of the Day by Judy Collins (1972)
 ...Hits by Phil Collins (1998)
 The Singles by Phil Collins (2016)
 Greatest Hits by Patricia Conroy (2000)
 Greatest Hits by Alice Cooper (1974)
 Greatest Hits Volume One by Billy "Crash" Craddock (1974)
 Greatest Hits by Billy "Crash" Craddock (1983)
 Lovecraft & Witch Hearts (Disc 1) by Cradle of Filth (2002)
 The Very Best of Cream by Cream (1995)
 Greatest Hits by Creed (2004)
 Chronicle: The 20 Greatest Hits by Creedence Clearwater Revival (1976)
 Greatest Hits by Crosby, Stills & Nash (2005)
 Greatest Hits by Chris Cummings (2004)
 The Best of Crush 40 – Super Sonic Songs by Crush 40 (2009)
 Greatest Hits by the Cure (2001)
 Icon by Billy Currington (2011)
 Icon by Billy Ray Cyrus (2011)

D
 Greatest Hits by Terence Trent D'Arby (2002)
 It's Not Over...The Hits So Far by Daughtry (2016)
 5 Years of mau5 by deadmau5 (2014)
 Deepest Purple: The Very Best of Deep Purple by Deep Purple (1980)
 Vault: Def Leppard Greatest Hits (1980–1995) by Def Leppard (1995)
 Best of Def Leppard by Def Leppard (2004)
 The Best of Deicide by Deicide (2003)
 John Denver's Greatest Hits by John Denver (1973)
 John Denver's Greatest Hits, Volume 2 by John Denver (1977)
 John Denver's Greatest Hits, Volume 3 by John Denver (1984)
 Depeche Mode Greatest Hits by Depeche Mode (1987)
 The Singles 86–98 by Depeche Mode (1998)
 The Best of Depeche Mode Volume 1 by Depeche Mode (2006)
 #1's by Destiny's Child (2005)
 Devo's Greatest Hits by Devo (1990)
 Devo's Greatest Misses by Devo (1990)
 The Very Best of Dexys Midnight Runners by Dexys Midnight Runners (1991)
 Greatest Hits by Dido (2013)
 The Very Beast of Dio by Dio (2000)
 Money for Nothing by Dire Straits (1988)
 Sultans of Swing: The Very Best of Dire Straits by Dire Straits (1998)
 Private Investigations by Dire Straits and Mark Knopfler (2005)
 Greatest Hits by Jason Donovan (1991)
 Greatest Hits by Jason Donovan (2006)
 13 by The Doors (1970)
 Chronicles: Death Row Classics by Dr. Dre (2006)
 Greatest Hits by Dr. Hook & the Medicine Show (1980)
 Greatest Hit (...and 21 Other Pretty Cool Songs) by Dream Theater (2008)
 The Drifters Golden Hits by the Drifters (1968)
 Best of Hilary Duff by Hilary Duff (2009)
 Decade: Greatest Hits by Duran Duran (1989)
 Greatest by Duran Duran (1998)
 The Essential Collection by Duran Duran (2000)
 Bob Dylan's Greatest Hits by Bob Dylan (1967)
 Bob Dylan's Greatest Hits Vol. II by Bob Dylan (1971)
 Bob Dylan's Greatest Hits Volume 3 by Bob Dylan (1994)
 The Essential Bob Dylan by Bob Dylan (2000)

E
 Their Greatest Hits (1971-1975) by the Eagles (1976)
 Eagles Greatest Hits, Vol. 2 by the Eagles (1982)
 Greatest Hits Live by Earth, Wind & Fire (1996)
 Greatest Hits by Earth, Wind & Fire (1998)
 Evolution (1999) and When All Is Said (2006) by Edge of Sanity
 Olé ELO, the first compilation album by the Electric Light Orchestra (1976)
 ELO's Greatest Hits by Electric Light Orchestra (1979)
 Curtain Call: The Hits by Eminem (2005)
 Curtain Call 2 by Eminem (2022)
 Endless Summer by the Beach Boys
 Gloria Estefan Greatest Hits by Gloria Estefan (1992)
 Greatest Hits Vol. II by Gloria Estefan (2001)
 Greatest Hits by Eternal (1997)
 Greatest Hits by Eurythmics (1991)
 Greatest Hits by Sara Evans (2007)
 Ten Years Gone: The Best of Everclear 1994-2004 by Everclear (2004)
 24 Original Classics by The Everly Brothers (1984)
 Greatest Hits by Exposé (1995)

F
 This Is It: The Best of Faith No More by Faith No More (2003)
 Believers Never Die: Greatest Hits by Fall Out Boy (2009)
 Greatest Hits: Believers Never Die – Volume Two by Fall Out Boy (2019)
 Greatest Hits by Faster Pussycat (2003)
 The Best of Fear Factory by Fear Factory (2006)
 Greatest Hits by Five (2001)
 Greatest Hits by Five Star (1989)
 Greatest Hits by Fleetwood Mac (1971)
 Greatest Hits by Fleetwood Mac (1988)
 Greatest Hits by Foo Fighters (2009)
 Greatest Hits by Samantha Fox (1992)
 Greatest Hits by Samantha Fox (2009)
 Aretha's Best by Aretha Franklin (2001)
 Greatest Hits by Janie Fricke (1982)
 Hits To The Head by Franz Ferdinand (2022)

G
 Absolute Garbage by Garbage (2007)
 Greatest Hits by Marvin Gaye (1964)
 Marvin Gaye's Greatest Hits by Marvin Gaye (1976)
 Turn It On Again: The Hits by Genesis (1999)
 R-Kive by Genesis (2014)
 The Last Domino? – The Hits by Genesis (2021)
 Greatest Hits by Debbie Gibson (1995)
 Icon by Vince Gill (2010)
 The Sound of Girls Aloud: The Greatest Hits by Girls Aloud (2006)
 Ten by Girls Aloud (2012)
 The Best by Girls' Generation (2014)
 Greatest Hits by Go West (1996)
 Greatest Hits by Goldie Lookin Chain (2004)
 For You by Selena Gomez (2014)
 In a Coma: 1995–2005 by Matthew Good (2005)
 Greatest Hits by Good Charlotte (2010)
 The Singles Collection 2001–2011 by Gorillaz (2011)
 Greatest Hits by Grand Funk Railroad (2006)
 The Best by Ariana Grande (2017)
 Greatest Hits 1986-2004 by Amy Grant (2004)
 Greatest Hits by David Gray (2007)
 Al Green's Greatest Hits by Al Green (1975)
 Greatest Hits: God's Favorite Band by Green Day (2017)
 International Superhits! by Green Day (2001)
 The Guess Who – Greatest Hits by the Guess Who (1999)
 Greatest Hits by Guns N' Roses (2004)
 The Best of Arlo Guthrie by Arlo Guthrie (1977)

H
 Greatest Hits by Half Japanese (1995)
A Best by Ayumi Hamasaki (2001)
A Best 2: Black by Ayumi Hamasaki (2007)
A Best 2: White by Ayumi Hamasaki (2007)
 Hard-Fi: Best of 2004 – 2014 by Hard-Fi (2014)
 Greatest Hits by Steve Harley & Cockney Rebel (1988)
 The Very Best of Emmylou Harris: Heartaches & Highways by Emmylou Harris (2005)
 Midwesterners: The Hits by Hawthorne Heights (2010)
 The Essential Heart by Heart (2002)
 Greatest Hits/Live by Heart (1980)
 Greatest Hits by Heart (1998)
 Greatest Hits: 1985–1995 by Heart (2000)
 These Dreams: Greatest Hits by Heart (1997)
The Best of Hed Planet Earth by Hed PE
Major Pain 2 Indee Freedom: The Best of Hed P.E. by Hed PE
 And Love Said No: The Greatest Hits 1997–2004 by HIM (2004)
 XX - Two Decades of Love Metal by HIM (2012)
 Greatest Hits (Marcia Hines album) by Marcia Hines (1981)
 Greatest Hits Volume 2 by Marcia Hines (1982)
 Diva (Marcia Hines album) by Marcia Hines (2001)
 Marcia: Greatest Hits 1975–1983 by Marcia Hines (2004)
 The Best of Hootie & the Blowfish: 1993–2003 by Hootie & the Blowfish (2004)
 Whitney: The Greatest Hits by Whitney Houston (2000)
 Greatest Hits by the Human League (1988, 1996)
 Classics by Hybrid (2012)

I
 Greatest Hits by Ice Cube (2001)
 Greatest Hits by Billy Idol (2001)
 The Very Best of Billy Idol: Idolize Yourself by Billy Idol (2008)
 Greatest Hits by Enrique Iglesias (2008)
 The Greatest Hits by Il Divo (2012)
 The Best of Ill Niño by Ill Niño (2006)
 Greatest Hits by Immature/IMx (2001)
 Monuments and Melodies by Incubus (2009)
 Greatest Hits by In Flames (2012)
 Greatest Hits by Inspiral Carpets (2003)
 Greatest Hits by INXS (1994)
 The Best of INXS by INXS (2002)
 The Years 1979–1997 by INXS (2002)
 The Very Best by INXS (2011)
 Best of the Beast by Iron Maiden (1996)
 Greatest Hits by Burl Ives

J
 The Greatest Hits Collection by Alan Jackson (1995)
 Greatest Hits Volume II by Alan Jackson (2003)
 Design of a Decade: 1986-1996 by Janet Jackson (1995)
 Number Ones by Janet Jackson (2009)
 Icon: Number Ones by Janet Jackson (2010)
 The Best of Michael Jackson by Michael Jackson (1975)
 18 Greatest Hits by Michael Jackson (1983)
 14 Greatest Hits by Michael Jackson (1984)
 Greatest Hits: HIStory, Volume I by Michael Jackson (1995)
 20th Century Masters – The Millennium Collection: The Best of Michael Jackson by Michael Jackson (2000)
 Number Ones by Michael Jackson (2003)
 The Essential Michael Jackson by Michael Jackson (2005)
 Icon by Michael Jackson (2012)
 The Best of Michael Jackson & The Jackson 5ive by Michael Jackson and the Jackson 5 (1997)
 The Very Best of Michael Jackson with The Jackson Five by Michael Jackson and the Jackson 5 (1999)
 Greatest Hits by the Jackson 5 (1971)
 Greatest Hits by the Jam (1991)
 Icon by Ja Rule (2012)
 Greatest Hits by Jay-Z (2010)
 Greatest Hits by Wyclef Jean (2003)
 The Worst of Jefferson Airplane by Jefferson Airplane (1970)
 Greatest Hits by the Jets (2004)
 Goodbye – The Greatest Hits by JLS (2013)
 The Essential Billy Joel by Billy Joel (2001)
 Greatest Hits – Volume I & Volume II by Billy Joel (1985)
 Greatest Hits Volume III by Billy Joel (1997)
 Greatest Hits by Joe (2008)
 Elton John's Greatest Hits by Elton John (1974)
 Elton John's Greatest Hits Volume II by Elton John (1977)
 Elton John's Greatest Hits Vol. 3 by Elton John (1987)
 Elton John Greatest Hits by Elton John (1994)
 Janis Joplin's Greatest Hits by Janis Joplin (1973)
 Greatest Hits by Journey (1988)
 Greatest Hits 2 by Journey (2011)
 Greatest Hits by the Judds (1988)
 The Greatest Hits by Juvenile (2004)

K
 Brave Yester Days (2004) by Katatonia
 The Black Sessions (2005) by Katatonia
 The Best of Keane by Keane (2013)
 Greatest Hits Volume One by Toby Keith (1998)
 Greatest Hits 2 by Toby Keith (2004)
 Kenny G - Greatest Hits by Kenny G (1997)
 The Boy Who Flew to the Moon, Vol. 1 by Kid Cudi (2022)
 Kidz Bop Greatest Hits by Kidz Bop (2009)
 Direct Hits by the Killers
 The Best of King Diamond by King Diamond (2003)
 Greatest Hits! by the Kinks (1966)
 The Kink Kronikles by the Kinks (1972)
 Greatest Kiss by Kiss (1997)
 The Very Best of Kiss by Kiss (2002)
 20th Century Masters – The Millennium Collection: The Best of Kiss by Kiss (2003)
 Greatest Hits Vol. 1 by Korn (2004)
 Greatest Hits by Lenny Kravitz (2000)

L
 Twelve Deadly Cyns...and Then Some by Cyndi Lauper (1994)
 Best Of by LaFee (2009)
 The Best of Led Zeppelin by Led Zeppelin (1999, 2000, 2002)
 Mothership by Led Zeppelin (2007)
 The Best of The Lemonheads: The Atlantic Years by the Lemonheads (1998)
 Greatest Hits Live Tour by Level 42 (2005)
 Greatest Hits & Videos by Huey Lewis and the News (2006)
 The Very Best of Gordon Lightfoot by Gordon Lightfoot (1974)
 Greatest Hitz by Limp Bizkit (2005)
 Icon by Limp Bizkit (2011)
 Between Us by Little Mix (2021)
 The Essential Kenny Loggins by Kenny Loggins (2002)
 Dance Again... the Hits by Jennifer Lopez (2012)
 The Greatest Hits by Lulu (2003)
 Greatest Hits by Luv' (1979)
 Greatest Hits by Luv' (1990)
 Greatest Hits by Lynyrd Skynyrd (2005)
 Icon by Lynyrd Skynyrd (2010)

M
 The Immaculate Collection by Madonna (1990)
 GHV2 by Madonna (2001)
 Celebration by Madonna (2009)
 Greatest Hits by Charlie Major (2007)
 16 of Their Greatest Hits by the Mamas & the Papas (1969)
 Greatest Hits by Barry Manilow (1978)
 Greatest Hits: The Platinum Collection by Barry Manilow (1993)
 Lest We Forget: The Best Of by Marilyn Manson (2004)
 Legend by Bob Marley (1984)
 Greatest Hits by Richard Marx (1993)
 Greatest Hits by Richard Marx (1997)
 Johnny's Greatest Hits by Johnny Mathis (1958)
 Greatest Hits by Math the Band (2006)
 Greatest Hits by MC Hammer (1996)
 Greatest Hits by MC Lars (2012)
 Greatest Hits by Martina McBride (2001)
 All the Best! by Paul McCartney (1987)
 Greatest Hits 1995-2005 by Jason McCoy (2005)
 Greatest Hits by Neal McCoy (1997)
 All the Greatest Hits by McFly (2007)
 Greatest Hits by Tim McGraw (1996)
 Greatest Hits – Live by Don McLean (1997)
 Greatest Hits: Back to the Start by Megadeth (2005)
 The Best That I Could Do 1978–1988 by John Mellencamp (1997)
 Greatest Hits by Jo Dee Messina (2003)
 Songbook Vol. 1 by Mika (2013)
 Greatest Hits by Ronnie Milsap (1980)
 Greatest Fits by Ministry (2001)
 Greatest Hits by Kylie Minogue (1992)
 Greatest Hits by Kylie Minogue (2002)
 Greatest Hits: 87–99 by Kylie Minogue (2003)
 Ultimate Kylie by Kylie Minogue (2004)
 Kylie Hits by Kylie Minogue (2011)
 The Best of Kylie Minogue by Kylie Minogue (2012)
 Step Back in Time: The Definitive Collection by Kylie Minogue (2019)
 Greatest Hits by Kim Mitchell (1994)
 Machine Punch Through: The Singles Collection by Moist (2001)
 The Monkees Greatest Hits by the Monkees (1976)
 More Greatest Hits of the Monkees by the Monkees (1982)
 Greatest Hits by Monster Magnet (2003)
 Greatest Hits by John Michael Montgomery (1997)
 Greatest Hits by the Moody Blues (1989)
 Greatest Hits by Craig Morgan (2008)
 Greatest Hits by Morrissey (2008)
 Greatest Hits by Mötley Crüe (1998)
 Greatest Hits by Mötley Crüe (2009)
 The Essential Alison Moyet by Alison Moyet (2001)
 May Death Never Stop You by My Chemical Romance (2014)

N
 Greatest Hits by 'N Sync (2005)
 The Collection by 'N Sync (2010)
 The Essential *NSYNC by 'N Sync (2014)
 Greatest Hits by Nas (2007)
 Harvest of Hits by Nat King Cole (1950)
 Greatest Hits by Nazareth (1975)
 Greatest Hits by N-Dubz (2011)
 Hits by New Found Glory (2008)
 Greatest Hits by New Kids on the Block (1999, 2008)
 The Best of New Order by New Order (1994)
 International by New Order (2002)
 Singles by New Order (2005, 2016)
 Substance 1987 by New Order (1987)
 The Greatest Hits by Newsboys (2007)
 The Best of Nickelback Volume 1 by Nickelback (2013)
 Nightfall Overture by Nightingale (2004)
 Highest Hopes: The Best of Nightwish by Nightwish (2005)
 Nirvana by Nirvana (2002)
 Icon by Nirvana (2010)
 The Singles 1992-2003 by No Doubt (2003)
 The Greatest Songs Ever Written (By Us) by NOFX (2004)
 Greatest Hits by the Notorious B.I.G. (2007)
 Greatest Hits by N.W.A (1996)

O
 Greatest Hits by the Oak Ridge Boys (1980)
 Greatest Hits 2 by the Oak Ridge Boys (1984)
 Greatest Hits 3 by the Oak Ridge Boys (1989)
 Stop the Clocks by Oasis (2006)
 Time Flies... 1994–2009 by Oasis (2010)
 Greatest Hits by the Offspring (2005)
 Icon by Mike Oldfield (2012)
 Greatest Hits by Roy Orbison (2009)
 Greatest Hits of the Outlaws, High Tides Forever by the Outlaws (1982)
 Greatest Hits by Jake Owen (2017)

P
 The Best of Pantera: Far Beyond the Great Southern Cowboys' Vulgar Hits! by Pantera (2003)
 ...To Be Loved: The Best of Papa Roach by Papa Roach (2010)
 Parliament's Greatest Hits by Parliament (1984)
 Greatest Hits by Dolly Parton (1982)
 Greatest Hits by the Partridge Family (1989)
 The Best of Laura Pausini: E ritorno da te by Laura Pausini (2001)
 20: The Greatest Hits by Laura Pausini (2013)
 Rearviewmirror (Greatest Hits 1991–2003) by Pearl Jam (2004)
 The Best of Peter, Paul and Mary: Ten Years Together by Peter, Paul and Mary (1970)
 Greatest Hits by Tom Petty & the Heartbreakers (1993)
 Greatest Hits... So Far!!! by Pink (2010)
 The Best of Pink Floyd: A Foot in the Door by Pink Floyd (2011)
 The Best of Pink Floyd / Masters of Rock by Pink Floyd (1970)
 Echoes: The Best of Pink Floyd by Pink Floyd (2001)
 Once More with Feeling: Singles 1996–2004 by Placebo (2004)
 Greatest Hits: The Atlantic Years by P.O.D. (2006)
 Poison's Greatest Hits: 1986-1996 by Poison (1996)
 Greatest Hits by the Police (1992)
 ELV1S by Elvis Presley (2002)
 Elvis' Golden Records by Elvis Presley (1958)
 ELVIIS: 2nd to None by Elvis Presley (2003)
 They Can't All Be Zingers by Primus (2006)
 The Hits/The B-Sides by Prince (1993)
 The Very Best of Prince by Prince (2001)
 Ultimate Prince by Prince (2006)
 Their Law: The Singles 1990–2005 by the Prodigy (2005)
 Greatest Hits by P-Square (2013)

Q
 Greatest Hits by Queen (1981)
 Greatest Hits II by Queen (1991)
 Greatest Hits III by Queen (1999)
 Icon by Queen (2013)
 Greatest Hits in Japan by Queen (2020)
 Flashback by Ivy Queen (2005)
 The Best of Ivy Queen by Ivy Queen (2006)
 Greatest Hits by Ivy Queen (2007)
 Greatest Hits by Queensrÿche (2000)
 Greatest Hits by Quiet Riot (1996)

R
 Radiohead: The Best Of by Radiohead (2008)
 Made in Germany 1995–2011 by Rammstein (2011)
 Greatest Hits by the Ramones (2006)
 Greatest Hits, Vol. 1 by Rare Essence (1995)
 Greatest Hits Volume 1 by Rascal Flatts (2008)
 What Hits!? by Red Hot Chili Peppers (1992)
 Greatest Hits by Red Hot Chili Peppers (2003)
 Greatest Hit...and More by Reel Big Fish (2006)
 Greatest Hits by Restless Heart (1998)
 Greatest Hits by Paul Revere & The Raiders (1967)
 The Anthology 1962-1974 by the Righteous Brothers (1989)
 Greatest Hits by LeAnn Rimes (2003)
 Greatest Hits by Kenny Rogers (1980)
 Big Hits (High Tide and Green Grass) by the Rolling Stones (1966)
 Forty Licks by the Rolling Stones (2002)
 GRRR! by the Rolling Stones (2012)
 Hot Rocks 1964–1971 by the Rolling Stones (1971)
 Rolled Gold: The Very Best of the Rolling Stones by the Rolling Stones (1975)
 Through the Past, Darkly (Big Hits Vol. 2) by the Rolling Stones (1969)
 Greatest Hits by Linda Ronstadt (1976)
 Greatest Hits, Volume 2 by Linda Ronstadt (1980)
 A Retrospective by Linda Ronstadt (1977)
 Greatest Hits by Demis Roussos (1974)
 Golden Hits (Demis Roussos album) by Demis Roussos (1975)
 Life & Love by Demis Roussos (1978)
 Insel der Zärtlichkeit by Demi Roussos (1980)
 The Phenomenon 1968–1998 (a.k.a. Forever and Ever – 40 Greatest Hits) by Demis Roussos (1998)
 Forever and Ever – Definitive Collection by Demis Roussos (2002)
 Collected by Demis Roussos (2015)
 The Best of Roxy Music by Roxy Music (2001)
 Greatest Hits by Roxy Music (1977)
 Greatest Hits by Run-D.M.C. (2002)
 The Spirit of Radio: Greatest Hits 1974-1987 by Rush (2003)

S
 Greatest Hits by Safri Duo (2010)
 Moving Forward in Reverse: Greatest Hits by Saliva (2010)
 Santana's Greatest Hits by Santana (1974)
 Greatest Hits by the Saturdays (2014)
 Still the Orchestra Plays by Savatage (2010)
 Tales from the Script: Greatest Hits by the Script (2021)
 Seether: 2002-2013 by Seether (2013)
 Greatest Hits by Bob Seger (1994)
 Greatest Hits by Selena (2003)
 The Best of Sepultura by Sepultura (2006)
Seeking the Way: The Greatest Hits by Shadows Fall (2007)
 Greatest Hits by the Shadows (1963)
 Grandes Éxitos by Shakira (2002)
Best Of... by Sia (2012)
 Simon and Garfunkel's Greatest Hits by Simon and Garfunkel (1972)
 Greatest Hits by Simply Red (1996)
 40 Seasons: The Best of Skid Row by Skid Row (1998)
 Antennas to Hell by Slipknot (2012)
 Greatest Hits by Sly & the Family Stone (1970)
 All Star Smash Hits by Smash Mouth (2005)
 Rotten Apples by the Smashing Pumpkins (2001)
 Best...I by the Smiths (1992)
 ...Best II by the Smiths (1992)
 Singles by the Smiths (1995)
 The Very Best of The Smiths by the Smiths (2001)
 Greatest Hits by Will Smith (2002)
 Greatest Hits by Snow Patrol (2013)
 Greatest Hits by Social Distortion (2007)
 The Sledgehammer Files: The Best of Soilwork 1998 - 2008 by Soilwork (2010)
 Greatest Hits by Sonia (2007)
 Greatest Hits by Sonny & Cher (1974)
 A-Sides by Soundgarden (1997)
 Telephantasm by Soundgarden (2010)
 The Essential Britney Spears by Britney Spears (2013)
 Greatest Hits: My Prerogative by Britney Spears (2004)
 The Singles Collection by Britney Spears (2009)
 Playlist: The Very Best of Britney Spears by Britney Spears (2012)
 Greatest Hits by the Specials (2006)
 Greatest Hits by Spice Girls (2007)
 Everything Hits at Once: The Best of Spoon by Spoon (2019)
 Greatest Hits by Bruce Springsteen (1995)
 Greatest Hits by Bruce Springsteen and the E Street Band (2009)
 Greatest Hits by Squeeze (1992)
 Good Souls: The Greatest Hits by Starsailor (2015)
 Greatest Hits by Steely Dan (1978)
 Greatest Hits (1974-1978) by the Steve Miller Band (1978)
 Greatest Hits by Cat Stevens (1975)
Greatest Hits by Shakin' Stevens (1984)
 Greatest Hits, Vol. 1 by Rod Stewart (1979)
 Icon by George Strait (2011)
 Icon 2 by George Strait (2011)
 Greatest Hits by Styx (1995)
 Greatest Hits II by Styx (1996)
 Greatest Hits by Sublime (1999)
 20th Century Masters – The Millennium Collection: The Best of Sublime by Sublime (2002)
 Playlist: The Very Best of Suicidal Tendencies by Suicidal Tendencies (2010)
 All the Good Shit: 14 Solid Gold Hits 2000-2008 by Sum 41 (2008)
 Greatest Hits by Donna Summer (1998)
 Greatest Hits by the Supremes (1967)
 Greatest Hits by Survivor (1989, 1993)
 The Best Yet by Switchfoot (2008)

T
 Greatest Hits by Take That (1996)
 Odyssey by Take That (2018)
 Greatest Hits by James Taylor (1976)
 Tears Roll Down (Greatest Hits 82-92) by Tears For Fears (1992)
 Brotherhood by the Chemical Brothers (2008)
 Greatest Hits by the Temptations (1966)
 Greatest Hits, Vol. 2 by the Temptations (1970)
 The Greatest Hits by Texas (2000)
 Greatest Hits by Thalía (2004)
 Thin Lizzy Greatest Hits by Thin Lizzy (2004)
 Golden Bisquits by Three Dog Night (1971)
 Greatest Hits by Throbbing Gristle
 Greatest Hits by Tiffany
 tism.bestoff. by TISM (2002)
 The Essential Toto by Toto (2003)
 Greatest Hits by Train (2018)
 The Anthology by A Tribe Called Quest (1999)
 The Best of A Tribe Called Quest by A Tribe Called Quest (2008)
 Greatest Hits by Tanya Tucker (1989)
 The Greatest Hits of Ike & Tina Turner (1965)
 Greatest Hits by Ike & Tina Turner (1976)
 Get Back by Ike & Tina Turner (1985)
 Proud Mary: The Best of Ike & Tina Turner (1991)
 Icon by Josh Turner (2011)
 Save the Turtles: The Turtles Greatest Hits by the Turtles (2009)
 Greatest Hits by Shania Twain (2004)
 The Best of Type O Negative by Type O Negative (2006)

U
Utada Hikaru Single Collection Vol.1 by Hikaru Utada (2004)
Utada Hikaru Single Collection Vol. 2 by Hikaru Utada (2010)
Utada the Best by Hikaru Utada (2010)
Greatest Hits: Decade #1 by Carrie Underwood (2014)

V
 Best Of – Volume I by Van Halen (1996)
 The Best of Both Worlds by Van Halen (2004)
 20 Greatest Hits by the Ventures (1977)
 The Very Best of the Ventures by the Ventures (1975)
 The Vogues' Greatest Hits by the Vogues (1970)
 Best of by Roch Voisine (2007)

W
 The Best of Warrant by Warrant (1996)
 Greatest Hits by Jody Watley (1996)
 The Weeknd in Japan by the Weeknd (2018)
 The Highlights by the Weeknd (2021)
 Dottie West: Greatest Hits by Dottie West (1992)
 Unbreakable - The Greatest Hits Vol. 1 by Westlife (2002)
 Greatest Hits by Westlife (2011)
 Who's Better, Who's Best by the Who (1988)
 Greatest Hits by Kim Wilde (1999)
 Greatest Hits by Hank Williams Jr. (1969)
 Hank Williams, Jr.'s Greatest Hits by Hank Williams Jr. (1982)
 John Williams Greatest Hits 1969-1999 by John Williams (1999)
 Greatest Hits by Robbie Williams (2004)
 In and Out of Consciousness: Greatest Hits 1990–2010 by Robbie Williams (2010)
 Greatest Hits by Gretchen Wilson (2010)
 The Very Best of Winger by Winger (2001)
 20th Century Masters – The Millennium Collection by Steve Winwood (1999)
 Best of Steve Winwood by Steve Winwood (2002)
 Revolutions – The Very Best of Steve Winwood by Steve Winwood (2010)
 Greatest Hits by Stevie Wonder (1968)
 Greatest Hits Vol. 2 by Stevie Wonder (1971)
 Greatest Hits by Michelle Wright (2000)
 The Essential Wu-Tang Clan by Wu-Tang Clan (2013)

Y
 "Weird Al" Yankovic's Greatest Hits by "Weird Al" Yankovic (1988)
 Greatest Hits Volume II by "Weird Al" Yankovic (1994)
 The Yardbirds Greatest Hits by the Yardbirds (1967)
 Greatest Hits by Yellowcard (2011)
 Greatest Hits Tour Edition by Yellowcard (2011)
 Greatest Hits by Neil Young (2004)
 The Hits by Will Young (2009)
 Greatest Hits by Young Paperboyz (2015)

Z
 Greatest Hits by ZZ Top (1992)

See also
 Greatest Hits (disambiguation)
 Greatest Hits Volume Two and Greatest Hits Volume Three (disambiguations)
 Greatest, Hits and Greatest Hits Live (disambiguations), similar titles that apply to multiple albums
 Lists of albums
 List of Best albums
 Greatest Hits video games, a label applied to high-selling PlayStation, PlayStation 2, PSP and PlayStation 3 video games
 Greatest Hits (comics), a Vertigo comic series, with art by Glenn Fabry
 Welcome to the Videos – An example of a DVD greatest hits; by Guns N' Roses
 Greatest Hits Tour (Westlife), a 2003 tour by Irish pop band Westlife in support of their 2002 Greatest hits album

 List
Greatest Hits